In Ireland, a non-national is a person who is not from Ireland, though they may have Irish citizenship. The concept regularly arises in the media when discussing people from outside Ireland. However, its use has been questioned with some considering it a nonsense term since "non-national" implies a lack of any nationality whatsoever.

References

Demographics of the Republic of Ireland